Wang Minggui (born 1954) is a general in the People's Liberation Army of China. A native of Shangqiu, Henan, Wang obtained the rank of major general in 2004. He was investigated by the PLA's anti-graft agency in November 2013 and transferred to judicial organs in January 2014. He served as Deputy Political Commissar of People's Liberation Army Information Engineering University before serving as Political Commissar of People's Liberation Army Air Force Command College in 2008.

References

1954 births
Living people
People's Liberation Army generals from Henan